Rudi-Sedlmayer-Halle, also known by its sponsorship name of Audi Dome, is an indoor arena located in Sendling-Westpark, Munich, Germany. It was initially named after the president of the Bavarian State Sport Association. The 6,700-seat hall opened in 1972 to host basketball events for the 1972 Summer Olympics.
The arena has been the regular home venue of Bayern Munich basketball club since 2011.

Situation and environment
The hall is situated in the southwest of Munich, at the connection place of the A96 to the Mittlerer Ring, the internal belt road in the quarter Sendling west park. Address: Grasweg 74, 81373 Munich.

Northeast of the hall, a small garden is located. In the west and south west, sports complexes can be found. The "Westpark" of Munich is located south-east of the arena.

The hall can be reached by car over the main highway B2R, exit Grüntenstraße. By public transport, the arena can be reached by subway lines U4/U5 at the stop Heimeranplatz and by bus line 133 at the stop Siegenburger Straße.

Architecture and data
The hall was designed by the architect Georg Flinkerbush. The hall has a capacity of 7,200 for sporting events. The complex also includes a restaurant and a warm up hall

Utilization of the hall
Shortly after its completion, the hall served as the basketball venue for the 1972 Summer Olympics. In 1975, the arena served as one of the filming locations for the Science Fiction film Rollerball. It also hosted the 1978 FIBA European Champions Cup final in which Real Madrid defeated Mobilgirgi Varese 75-67. On 23 April 1983, the arena played host to the 1983 Eurovision Song Contest.

On 5 May 2001, Irish vocal pop band Westlife held a concert for their Where Dreams Come True Tour supporting their album Coast to Coast. On 1 February 2003, the arena was closed for unknown reasons.  It reopened in 2007 under new operator MPP Entertainment.  Following the reopening, both the Baskets Munich and the basketball team of Bayern Munich expressed interest in a tenancy. On 8 January 2009, it became well-known that the operator firm of the hall had registered for insolvency. In 2011, after renovations to the arena were completed, the newly promoted Bayern Munich basketball team moved into the arena.

See also
 List of indoor arenas in Germany

References

External links

Official site 
1972 Summer Olympics official report. Volume 2. Part 2. pp. 201–2.

Image of the arena's interior when configured for basketball

Indoor arenas in Germany
Basketball venues in Germany
Sports venues in Munich
Music venues completed in 1972
Sports venues completed in 1972
Venues of the 1972 Summer Olympics
Olympic basketball venues
Olympic judo venues
FC Bayern Munich